Rother District Council is the local authority for Rother District in East Sussex, England. The council is elected every four years. Since the last boundary changes in 2003, 38 councillors have been elected from 20 wards.

Political control
Since the first election to the council in 1973 political control of the council has been held by the following parties:

Leadership
The leaders of the council since 2001 have been:

Council elections
Summary of the council composition after recent council elections, click on the year for full details of each election. Boundary changes took place for the 2003 election reducing the number of seats by 7.

1973 Rother District Council election
1976 Rother District Council election
1979 Rother District Council election
1983 Rother District Council election (New ward boundaries)
1987 Rother District Council election

District result maps

By-election results
By-elections occur when seats become vacant between council elections. Below is a summary of recent by-elections; full by-election results can be found by clicking on the by-election name.

References

External links
Rother District Council

 
Council elections in East Sussex
Rother